Petar Milić (born 12 March 1998) is a Serbian football forward, who plays for OFK Beograd.

References

External links
 
 Petar Milić stats at utakmica.rs 
 
 

1998 births
Living people
Footballers from Belgrade
Association football forwards
Serbian footballers
OFK Beograd players
FK Bežanija players
FK Čukarički players
Red Star Belgrade footballers
Serbian First League players
Serbian SuperLiga players